Zavalino is a rural locality (a selo) in Razdolyevskoye Rural Settlement, Kolchuginsky District, Vladimir Oblast, Russia. The population was 23 as of 2010.

Geography 
Zavalino is located 16 km southeast of Kolchugino (the district's administrative centre) by road. Vishnevy is the nearest rural locality.

References 

Rural localities in Kolchuginsky District